María Elena Coppola González (29 November 1949 – 31 July 2016), better known as Mariana Karr, was an Argentine-Mexican actress who worked mostly in films and telenovelas.

Filmography
, 1969
, 1976
, 1978
, 1980
, 1985

Telenovelas
, 1977
, 1982
, 1984
, 1986
, 1995
, 1995
, 1996
, 1997
, 1998
, 2000
, 2001
, 2001
, 2002
, 2003
, 2003
, 2005
, 2005
, 2007
, 2008
, 2008
, 2011
, 2011
, 2013
, 2013
, 2014
, 2015

Theatre
, 2014

References

External links
 

Argentine soap opera actresses
Argentine film actresses
Mexican telenovela actresses
Actresses from Buenos Aires
Argentine expatriates in Mexico
1949 births
2016 deaths